Sigchos is a town in Cotopaxi Province, Ecuador.

External links 
 Map of the Cotopaxi Province
 www.inec.gov.ec
 www.ame.gov.ec
 Travel guide

Populated places in Cotopaxi Province